Samuel Denoff (July 1, 1928 – July 8, 2011) was an American screenwriter and television producer.

Biography
Denoff was born to a Jewish family in Brooklyn, New York, the son of Esther (Rothbard) and Harry Denoff, a salesman. With his long-time collaborator Bill Persky he wrote and created the television show That Girl starring Marlo Thomas. Their writing collaboration on episodes of The Dick Van Dyke Show resulted in some of the show's most popular episodes. Denoff also wrote for the 1976 Danny Thomas situation comedy The Practice.

Personal life
Denoff married twice. His first wife was Bernice Levey; they had two children, Leslie Denoff and producer Douglas Denoff. His second wife was dancer Sharon Shore with whom he had two children, Melissa Denoff and Matthew Denoff. Denoff died from complications of Alzheimer's disease at his home in the Brentwood section of Los Angeles, at the age of 83.

References

External links

Sam Denoff interview at the Archive of American Television
Find a Grave

American male screenwriters
Jewish American screenwriters
American television producers
Emmy Award winners
1928 births
2011 deaths
21st-century American Jews
Burials at Eden Memorial Park Cemetery